Vadde Naveen is an Indian  actor and producer known for his works in Telugu films. His father Vadde Ramesh was a film producer.

Career
Although his first film released was Korukunna Priyudu (1997), his first movie as an actor was Kranthi, which was produced by his father under their home banner. However Kranthi went unreleased, so Korukunna Priyudu became his debut film. He starred in around 30 films as a protagonist. After a hiatus, Vadde Naveen played a negative role in Attack (2016).

Filmography

As actor

As producer

Awards
 2005 : Nandi special Jury Award for Best Performance - Naa Oopiri

References

External links

Living people
Telugu male actors
Male actors in Telugu cinema
Indian male film actors
20th-century Indian male actors
Nandi Award winners
Male actors from Vijayawada
21st-century Indian male actors
Year of birth missing (living people)